The 2012 BRD Sibiu Challenger was a professional tennis tournament played on clay courts. It was the 1st edition of the tournament which was part of the 2012 ATP Challenger Tour. It takes place in Sibiu, Romania between 6 and 12 August 2012.

Singles main draw entrants

Seeds

 1 Rankings are as of August 1, 2012.

Other entrants
The following players received wildcards into the singles main draw:
  Victor Vlad Cornea
  Lucian Gheorghe
  Petru-Alexandru Luncanu
  Florin Mergea

The following players received entry from the qualifying draw:
  Toni Androić
  André Ghem
  Vasile-Alexandru Ghilea
  Goran Tošić

Champions

Singles

 Adrian Ungur def.  Victor Hănescu, 6–4, 7–6(7–1)

Doubles

 Marin Draganja /  Lovro Zovko def.  Alexandru-Daniel Carpen /  Cristóbal Saavedra-Corvalán, 6–4, 4–6, [11–9]

External links
Official Website
ITF Search
ATP official site

BRD Sibiu Challenger
BRD Sibiu Challenger
2012 in Romanian tennis